White Eagle (Spanish:Águila blanca) is a 1941 Argentine drama film directed by Carlos Hugo Christensen and starring Francisco Petrone, Pablo Palitos and Felipe Romito.

Cast
 Francisco Petrone
 Pablo Palitos 
 Felipe Romito 
 Eduardo Cuitiño 
 Celia Podestá 
 Tito Alonso 
 Amanda Diana 
 Mariana Martí 
 Herminia Mancini
 Miguel Coiro
 Eduardo Primo

References

Bibliography 
 Rist, Peter H. Historical Dictionary of South American Cinema. Rowman & Littlefield, 2014.

External links 

1941 films
Argentine drama films
1941 drama films
1940s Spanish-language films
Films directed by Carlos Hugo Christensen
Argentine black-and-white films
1940s Argentine films